Sarah Ferguson wore a dress made from ivory duchesse satin and featuring heavy beading for her wedding to Prince Andrew, Duke of York (second son of Queen Elizabeth II) on 23 July 1986 at Westminster Abbey. Designed by Lindka Cierach, the beadwork incorporated various symbols including hearts representing romance, anchors and waves representing Prince Andrew's sailing background and bumblebees and thistles, which were taken from Sarah Ferguson's family heraldry. Copies of the dress, including the motifs specific to the royal family, went on sale in stores just hours after the end of the wedding. The headdress and bouquet, fabric rosettes or artificial silk flowers were used to adorn the gown itself. Ferguson was pleased with the dress, describing it in her 1997 memoir, My Story, as "an exquisite creation I'd lost twenty-six pounds to fit into. Lindka was a genius; I knew she could make the most flattering gown ever, and she had. It was amazingly boned, like a corset." Hair stylist Denise McAdam and make-up artist Teresa Fairminer attended to the bride, while florist Jane Packer designed the bouquet. The ivory silk wedding dress became the season's most sought-after style.

See also
 List of individual dresses

References

Ferguson Sarah
House of Windsor
British royal attire
1980s fashion